Aesop Label, commonly known as Aesop, is a British independent record label founded and based in Brixton, London. The label was launched in 2012 with a focus on releasing records available on limited runs of 12-inch vinyl as well as being available digitally.

History
Aesop was started by Adam Royal, its inaugural release was 'The Wheel from English musician Sohn, which was also marked his debut release and who later went on to release his debut album with 4AD, the album reached number 31 on the UK Albums Chart.  Primarily Aesop has worked with artists making music within the electronic-pop genre, with other releases of note coming from British musician TĀLĀ and her ‘The Duchess’ and ‘Alchemy’ EPs. As of 2015 TĀLĀ has now signed to major label Columbia Records. Aesop released the debut EP from Wayward who later went on to sign with UK label, Black Butter Records. In 2014 Aesop released the debut EP from UK duo Sylas entitled ’Shore’, which also featured production and vocals from the highly acclaimed musician, Brian Eno. In July 2015 Aesop released the debut single from Dutch duo Klyne. Label founder Adam Royal contributed to the HUH. Magazine 'Label Picks' series about how the Sylas release came about.

Aesop was featured as "Label of the Week" in the 16 April 2014 issue of NME. At the end of 2014 Noisey named Aesop one of their record labels of the year in their article "These Are the British Record Labels That Killed It in 2014".

Artists
 Gent Mason
 Sohn
 Sylas
 TĀLĀ
 Wayward
 Klyne
 Jens Kuross

Discography

Art direction
The Aesop logo was designed by British artist David Bray, known for his intricate illustrative style. The logo adorns the A-side centre label of the 12-inch vinyl versions of Aesop releases. A subtle line spanning across the width of the centre label behind the logo is either positioned at 33 or 45 degrees from the top most point of the logo, this dictates at which speed the record should be played at, either 33 or 45 RPM.

References

External links
 

British independent record labels
Record labels established in 2012